Zaruiyeh may refer to:
 Zaruiyeh-ye Olya
 Zaruiyeh-ye Sofla